Muhammad Zahid Mahmood HI TI SI is an air marshal and flight instructor in the Pakistan Air Force who is the 6th and current vice chief of air staff. Prior to assuming the office in March 2022, he commanded the Combat Commanders' School at PAF Base Mushaf.

Career 
Mahmood was commissioned in GD Pilot branch of the Pakistan Air Force in April 1987. His staff appointments include deputy chief of air staff (Personal) at the Air Headquarters, director general of the Command, Control, Communications, Computers, and Intelligence (C4I) and assistant chief of the air staff (Plans).

He graduated from the Combat Commanders’ School, National Defence University, and the Air Command and Staff College, United States.

References 

Living people
Pakistan Air Force air marshals
Year of birth missing (living people)
Place of birth missing (living people)
Recipients of Hilal-i-Imtiaz
Recipients of Sitara-i-Imtiaz
Recipients of Tamgha-e-Imtiaz